Antony is a coastal civil parish and a village in Cornwall, England, United Kingdom.

The village is situated on the Rame Peninsula about three miles west of Torpoint and has a shop, a pub and a garage.

There are two possible etymologies of Antony: the first is that it is named in honour of St Anthony; the second is that it comes from the Anglicisation of the Cornish Tre- (“farmstead”) and -Anta (personal name)

Antony parish is bounded to the north by the tidal River Lynher (also known as the St Germans River) and to the south by the English Channel coast. To the east, the parish is bordered by Torpoint and St John parishes and to the west by Sheviock parish.

The parish is in the St Germans Registration District and had a population of 436 at the 2001 census, increasing to 500 at the 2011 census.  Apart from the church town, Antony, the only settlement of any size is Wilcove. Scraesdon Fort and Antony House are also in the parish.

At the time of Domesday Book (1086) the manor of Antony was held by Ermenhald from Tavistock Abbey.

Parish church
The medieval parish church, dedicated to St James in 1259, includes structural elements from the 13th, 14th and 15th centuries. The church houses memorials to members of the Carew family of Antony (18th century) and a large monumental brass to Margery Arundell, 1420.

Notable residents

 Richard Carew, 1555–1620; antiquary and historian, author of The Survey of Cornwall;
 Sir Alexander Carew, 1609–1644; executed by Parliament for treason, 23 December 1644;
 John Carew, 1622–1660; signed death warrant for Charles I in 1649, executed for treason, October 1660; 
Francis Vyvyan Jago Arundell, (1780–1846), antiquarian, orientalist, and Anglican clergyman lived in Antony from 1809 until his death.

Twinning
Antony is twinned with Benodet (Benoded) in Brittany, France.

References

External links
 
 
 Antony Parish Council

Civil parishes in Cornwall
Villages in Cornwall
Populated coastal places in Cornwall
Manors in Cornwall